2200 series may refer to:

Train types
 2200 series (CTA)
 Hankyu 2200 series electric multiple unit
 Keihan 2200 series electric multiple unit
 Meitetsu 2200 series, a Japanese train type

Other uses
 Unisys 2200 Series system architecture